Kabakovo (Qabaq) is a rural locality (a selo) and the administrative centre of Kabakovsky Selsoviet, Karmaskalinsky District, Bashkortostan, Russia. The population was 3,141 as of 2010. There are 48 streets.

Geography 
Kabakovo is located 31 km north of Karmaskaly (the district's administrative centre) by road. Salzigutovo is the nearest rural locality.

References 

Rural localities in Karmaskalinsky District